Bert Mozley (23 September 1923 – 28 October 2019) was an English international footballer who spent his entire professional career with hometown club Derby County. He also spent time with Shelton United and Nottingham Forest. After retiring as a player in 1955, he emigrated to Canada.

Mozley died on 28 October 2019, at the age of 96. For the last few months of his life, Mozley was the oldest-living England international footballer.

References

External links
Player profile at Post War English & Scottish Football League A - Z Player's Transfer Database
Player profile at EnglandStats.com

1923 births
2019 deaths
English footballers
England international footballers
Nottingham Forest F.C. players
Derby County F.C. players
English Football League players
English Football League representative players
Footballers from Derby
Association football fullbacks